Paul Aldridge (born 2 December 1981) is an English footballer who played in The Football League for Tranmere Rovers and Macclesfield Town. His father John was his manager whilst he was at Tranmere.

References

English footballers
Macclesfield Town F.C. players
Tranmere Rovers F.C. players
English Football League players
1981 births
Living people
Association football forwards